The Communist Party of Bolivia is a communist party in Bolivia. It was founded in 1950 by Raúl Ruiz González and other former members of the Revolutionary Left Party (PIR). It remained small and did not hold its first national party congress until 1959.

It soon entered the labor movement and was included in the leadership of the Central Obrera Boliviana and the FSTMB during the 1960s. However, it remained a minority force in most unions. The Sino-Soviet split further weakened the PCB. In 1964, Ruiz González and others broke away to form the pro-China Communist Party of Bolivia (Marxist–Leninist).

At the time, the U.S. State Department estimated the party membership to be approximately 6,500.

In 1966, the Cuban-based revolutionary Che Guevara planned to initiate a guerrilla war against René Barrientos, Bolivia's military dictator. The PCB initially pledged its support, but became suspicious of Guevara when he arrived. The party did not participate in Guevara's campaign. Instead, Guevara formed a separate organization, the National Liberation Army (Ejército de Liberación Nacional).

When democracy was restored in Bolivia in the 1980s, the PCB remained a minor party. In 2003 it lost its designation as a recognized political party.

The PCB publishes Unidad (Unity).

As of 2019, Ignacio Mendoza served as the first secretary of the party.

General Secretaries
Simón Reyes Rivera (1950–c. 1967)
Mario Monje Molina, nicknamed “Estanislao” (c. 1967–c. 1970)
Jorge Kolle Cueto (c. 1970–1981)
Marcos Domich Ruiz (1985–2003)
Ignacio Mendoza Pizarro (2003–2008)

References

1950 establishments in Bolivia
Communist parties in Bolivia
Foro de São Paulo
International Meeting of Communist and Workers Parties
Political parties established in 1950
Political parties in Bolivia